Deeney is a surname. Notable people with the surname include:

Saul Deeney (born 1983), Irish footballer
Troy Deeney (born 1988), English footballer
Vincent Deeney (1915–1999), American rower

See also
Beeney
Denney (surname)
Feeney
Seeney